The 1992–93 VfL Bochum season was the 55th season in club history.

Review and events
On 2 November 1992 head coach Holger Osieck was sacked. Jürgen Gelsdorf was appointed head coach on 6 November 1992.

Matches

Legend

Bundesliga

DFB-Pokal

Intertoto Cup

Squad

Squad and statistics

Squad, appearances and goals scored

Transfers

Summer

In:

Out:

Winter

In:

Out:

VfL Bochum II

|}

Sources

External links
 1992–93 VfL Bochum season at Weltfussball.de 
 1992–93 VfL Bochum season at kicker.de 
 1992–93 VfL Bochum season at Fussballdaten.de 

Bochum
VfL Bochum seasons